Üçgöz (formerly known as Sofraz or Sofrazköy) is a village in the Besni District, Adıyaman Province, Turkey. Its population is 1,086 (2021). Before the 2013 reorganisation, it was a town (belde).

Archeology 
South of the village flows the Sofraz Çayı (also called the Değirmen Çayı), a tributary of the Göksu.

South of the village is an ancient settlement of Hellenistic and Roman date (based on archaeological finds). In this area, a stele was found in 1973, which shows Antiochus I of Commagene and Apollo shaking hands. Another find was a funerary altar with a relief carving of a griffin on a wheel and an inscription in which the genealogy of a noble Commagenian family is described. The altar is now on display in the Adıyaman Archaeological Museum. Near the settlement are the two , which contain Roman chamber tombs.

References

Villages in Besni District